António André da Silva Topa (2 September 1954 – 31 October 2021) was a Portuguese politician and engineer.  A member of the Social Democratic Party, he served in the Assembly of the Republic from 2015 until he died of a prolonged illness on 31 October 2021.

References

1954 births
2021 deaths
Portuguese politicians
Members of the Assembly of the Republic (Portugal)
Social Democratic Party (Portugal) politicians
People from Aveiro District